Aleksandr Kurasov (born 22 October 1992) is a Russian male acrobatic gymnast. With partners Valentin Chetverkin and Maksim Chulkov and Dmitry Bryzgalov, Kurasov achieved bronze in the 2014 Acrobatic Gymnastics World Championships.

References

External links
 

1992 births
Living people
Russian acrobatic gymnasts
Male acrobatic gymnasts
Medalists at the Acrobatic Gymnastics World Championships
21st-century Russian people